Pontodrilus is a genus of annelids belonging to the family Megascolecidae.

Species:

Pontodrilus bermudensis 
Pontodrilus ephippiger 
Pontodrilus lacustris 
Pontodrilus litoralis 
Pontodrilus primoris

References

Annelids